In electrodynamics, circular polarization of an electromagnetic wave is a polarization state in which, at each point, the electromagnetic field of the wave has a constant magnitude and is rotating at a constant rate in a plane perpendicular to the direction of the wave.

In electrodynamics, the strength and direction of an electric field is defined by its electric field vector. In the case of a circularly polarized wave, as seen in the accompanying animation, the tip of the electric field vector, at a given point in space, relates to the phase of the light as it travels through time and space. At any instant of time, the electric field vector of the wave indicates a point on a helix oriented along the direction of propagation. A circularly polarized wave can rotate in one of two possible senses: clockwise or right-handed circular polarization (RHCP) in which the electric field vector rotates in a right-hand sense with respect to the direction of propagation, and counter-clockwise or left-handed circular polarization (LHCP) in which the vector rotates in a left-hand sense.

Circular polarization is a limiting case of elliptical polarization. The other special case is the easier-to-understand linear polarization. All three terms were coined by Augustin-Jean Fresnel, in a memoir read to the French Academy of Sciences on 9 December 1822. Fresnel had first described the case of circular polarization, without yet naming it, in 1821.

The phenomenon of polarization arises as a consequence of the fact that light behaves as a two-dimensional transverse wave.

Circular polarization occurs when the two orthogonal electric field component vectors are of equal magnitude and are out of phase by exactly 90°, or one-quarter wavelength.

General description 

On the right is an illustration of the electric field vectors of a circularly polarized electromagnetic wave. The individual electric field vectors, as well as their combined vector, have a constant magnitude, and with changing phase angle. Given that this is a plane wave, each vector represents the magnitude and direction of the electric field for an entire plane that is perpendicular to the optical axis. Specifically, given that this is a circularly polarized plane wave, these vectors indicate that the electric field, from plane to plane, has a constant strength while its direction steadily rotates. Refer to these two images in the plane wave article to better appreciate this dynamic. This light is considered to be right-hand, clockwise circularly polarized if viewed by the receiver. Since this is an electromagnetic wave, each electric field vector has a corresponding, but not illustrated, magnetic field vector that is at a right angle to the electric field vector and proportional in magnitude to it. As a result, the magnetic field vectors would trace out a second helix if displayed.

Circular polarization is often encountered in the field of optics and, in this section, the electromagnetic wave will be simply referred to as light.

The nature of circular polarization and its relationship to other polarizations is often understood by thinking of the electric field as being divided into two components that are perpendicular to each other. The vertical component and its corresponding plane are illustrated in blue, while the horizontal component and its corresponding plane are illustrated in green. Notice that the rightward (relative to the direction of travel) horizontal component leads the vertical component by one quarter of a wavelength, a 90° phase difference. It is this quadrature phase relationship that creates the helix and causes the points of maximum magnitude of the vertical component to correspond with the points of zero magnitude of the horizontal component, and vice versa. The result of this alignment are select vectors, corresponding to the helix, which exactly match the maxima of the vertical and horizontal components. 

To appreciate how this quadrature phase shift corresponds to an electric field that rotates while maintaining a constant magnitude, imagine a dot traveling clockwise in a circle. Consider how the vertical and horizontal displacements of the dot, relative to the center of the circle, vary sinusoidally in time and are out of phase by one quarter of a cycle. The displacements are said to be out of phase by one quarter of a cycle because the horizontal maximum displacement (toward the left) is reached one quarter of a cycle before the vertical maximum displacement is reached. Now referring again to the illustration, imagine the center of the circle just described, traveling along the axis from the front to the back. The circling dot will trace out a helix with the displacement toward our viewing left, leading the vertical displacement. Just as the horizontal and vertical displacements of the rotating dot are out of phase by one quarter of a cycle in time, the magnitude of the horizontal and vertical components of the electric field are out of phase by one quarter of a wavelength.

The next pair of illustrations is that of left-handed, counterclockwise circularly polarized light when viewed by the receiver. Because it is left-handed, the rightward (relative to the direction of travel) horizontal component is now lagging the vertical component by one quarter of a wavelength, rather than leading it.

Reversal of handedness

Waveplate
To convert circularly polarized light to the other handedness, one can use a half-waveplate. A half-waveplate shifts a given linear component of light one half of a wavelength relative to its orthogonal linear component.

Reflection
The handedness of polarized light is reversed reflected off a surface at normal incidence. Upon such reflection, the rotation of the plane of polarization of the reflected light is identical to that of the incident field. However, with propagation now in the opposite direction, the same rotation direction that would be described as "right-handed" for the incident beam, is "left-handed" for propagation in the reverse direction, and vice versa. Aside from the reversal of handedness, the ellipticity of polarization is also preserved (except in cases of reflection by a birefringent surface).

Note that this principle only holds strictly for light reflected at normal incidence. For instance, right circularly polarized light reflected from a dielectric surface at grazing incidence (an angle beyond the Brewster angle) will still emerge as right-handed, but elliptically, polarized. Light reflected by a metal at non-normal incidence will generally have its ellipticity changed as well. Such situations may be solved by decomposing the incident circular (or other) polarization into components of linear polarization parallel and perpendicular to the plane of incidence, commonly denoted p and s respectively. The reflected components in the p and s linear polarizations are found by applying the Fresnel coefficients of reflection, which are generally different for those two linear polarizations. Only in the special case of normal incidence, where there is no distinction between p and s, are the Fresnel coefficients for the two components identical, leading to the above property.

Conversion to and from linear polarization
Circularly polarized light can be converted into linearly polarized light by passing it through a quarter-waveplate. Passing linearly polarized light through a quarter-waveplate with its axes at 45° to its polarization axis will convert it to circular polarization. In fact, this is the most common way of producing circular polarization in practice. Note that passing linearly polarized light through a quarter-waveplate at an angle other than 45° will generally produce elliptical polarization.

Handedness conventions  

 

Circular polarization may be referred to as right-handed or left-handed, and clockwise or anti-clockwise, depending on the direction in which the electric field vector rotates. Unfortunately, two opposing historical conventions exist.

From the point of view of the source 

Using this convention, polarization is defined from the point of view of the source. When using this convention, left- or right-handedness is determined by pointing one's left or right thumb away from the source, in the same direction that the wave is propagating, and matching the curling of one's fingers to the direction of the temporal rotation of the field at a given point in space. When determining if the wave is clockwise or anti-clockwise circularly polarized, one again takes the point of view of the source, and while looking away from the source and in the same direction of the wave's propagation, one observes the direction of the field's spatial rotation.

Using this convention, the electric field vector of a left-handed circularly polarized wave is as follows:

As a specific example, refer to the circularly polarized wave in the first animation. Using this convention, that wave is defined as right-handed because when one points one's right thumb in the same direction of the wave's propagation, the fingers of that hand curl in the same direction of the field's temporal rotation. It is considered clockwise circularly polarized because, from the point of view of the source, looking in the same direction of the wave's propagation, the field rotates in the clockwise direction. The second animation is that of left-handed or anti-clockwise light, using this same convention.

This convention is in conformity with the Institute of Electrical and Electronics Engineers (IEEE) standard and, as a result, it is generally used in the engineering community.

Quantum physicists also use this convention of handedness because it is consistent with their convention of handedness for a particle's spin.

Radio astronomers also use this convention in accordance with an International Astronomical Union (IAU) resolution made in 1973.

From the point of view of the receiver 

In this alternative convention, polarization is defined from the point of view of the receiver. Using this convention, left- or right-handedness is determined by pointing one's left or right thumb toward the source, against the direction of propagation, and then matching the curling of one's fingers to the spatial rotation of the field.

When using this convention, in contrast to the other convention, the defined handedness of the wave matches the handedness of the screw type nature of the field in space. Specifically, if one freezes a right-handed wave in time, when one curls the fingers of one's right hand around the helix, the thumb will point in the direction of progression for the helix, given the sense of rotation. Note that, in the context of the nature of all screws and helices, it does not matter in which direction you point your thumb when determining its handedness.

When determining if the wave is clockwise or anti-clockwise circularly polarized, one again takes the point of view of the receiver and, while looking toward the source, against the direction of propagation, one observes the direction of the field's temporal rotation.

Just as in the other convention, right-handedness corresponds to a clockwise rotation, and left-handedness corresponds to an anti-clockwise rotation.

Many optics textbooks use this second convention. It is also used by SPIE as well as the  International Union of Pure and Applied Chemistry (IUPAC).

Uses of the two conventions 

As stated earlier, there is significant confusion with regards to these two conventions. As a general rule, the engineering, quantum physics, and radio astronomy communities use the first convention, in which the wave is observed from the point of view of the source. In many physics textbooks dealing with optics, the second convention is used, in which the light is observed from the point of view of the receiver.

To avoid confusion, it is good practice to specify "as defined from the point of view of the source" or "as defined from the point of view of the receiver" when discussing polarization matters.

The archive of the US Federal Standard 1037C proposes two contradictory conventions of handedness.

FM radio 
The term "circular polarization" is often used erroneously to describe mixed polarity signals used mostly in FM radio (87.5 to 108.0 MHz in the USA), in which a vertical and a horizontal component are propagated simultaneously by a single or a combined array. This has the effect of producing greater penetration into buildings and difficult reception areas than a signal with just one plane of polarization. This would be an instance in which the polarization would more appropriately be called random polarization because the polarization at a receiver, although constant, will vary depending on the direction from the transmitter and other factors in the transmitting antenna design. See Stokes parameters.
The term "FM radio" above refers to FM broadcasting, not two-way radio (more properly called land mobile radio), which uses vertical polarization almost exclusively.

Dichroism

Circular dichroism (CD) is the differential absorption of left- and right-handed circularly polarized light. Circular dichroism is the basis of a form of spectroscopy that can be used to determine the optical isomerism and secondary structure of molecules.

In general, this phenomenon will be exhibited in absorption bands of any optically active molecule. As a consequence, circular dichroism is exhibited by most biological molecules, because of the dextrorotary (e.g., some sugars) and levorotary (e.g., some amino acids) molecules they contain. Noteworthy as well is that a secondary structure will also impart a distinct CD to its respective molecules. Therefore, the alpha helix, beta sheet and random coil regions of proteins and the double helix of nucleic acids have CD spectral signatures representative of their structures.

Also, under the right conditions, even non-chiral molecules will exhibit magnetic circular dichroism — that is, circular dichroism induced by a magnetic field.

Luminescence
Circularly polarized luminescence (CPL) can occur when either a luminophore or an ensemble of luminophores is chiral. The extent to which emissions are polarized is quantified in the same way it is for circular dichroism, in terms of the dissymmetry factor, also sometimes referred to as the anisotropy factor. This value is given by:

The maximum absolute value of gem, corresponding to purely left- or right-handed circular polarization, is therefore 2. Meanwhile, the smallest absolute value that gem can achieve, corresponding to linearly polarized or unpolarized light, is zero.

Mathematical description
The classical sinusoidal plane wave solution of the electromagnetic wave equation for the electric and magnetic fields is:

where k is the wavenumber;

Here,

is the amplitude of the field, and

is the normalized Jones vector in the x-y plane.

The Jones vector is:

where the plus sign indicates left circular polarization, and the minus sign indicates right circular polarization. In the case of circular polarization, the electric field vector of constant magnitude rotates in the x-y plane.

If basis vectors are defined such that:

and:

then the polarization state can be written in the "R-L basis" as:

where:

and:

Antennas

A number of different types of antenna elements can be used to produce circularly polarized (or nearly so) radiation; following Balanis, one can use dipole elements:
"... two crossed dipoles provide the two orthogonal field components.... If the two dipoles are identical, the field intensity of each along zenith ... would be of the same intensity. Also, if the two dipoles were fed with a 90° degree time-phase difference (phase quadrature), the polarization along zenith would be circular.... One way to obtain the 90° time-phase difference between the two orthogonal field components, radiated respectively by the two dipoles, is by feeding one of the two dipoles with a transmission line which is 1/4 wavelength longer or shorter than that of the other," p.80;
or helical elements:
"To achieve circular polarization [in axial or end-fire mode] ... the circumference C of the helix must be ... with C/wavelength = 1 near optimum, and the spacing about S = wavelength/4," p.571;
or patch elements:
"... circular and elliptical polarizations can be obtained using various feed arrangements or slight modifications made to the elements.... Circular polarization can be obtained if two orthogonal modes are excited with a 90° time-phase difference between them. This can be accomplished by adjusting the physical dimensions of the patch.... For a square patch element, the easiest way to excite ideally circular polarization is to feed the element at two adjacent edges.... The quadrature phase difference is obtained by feeding the element with a 90° power divider," p.859.

In quantum mechanics

In the quantum mechanical view, light is composed of photons. Polarization is a manifestation of the spin angular momentum of light. More specifically, in quantum mechanics, the direction of spin of a photon is tied to the handedness of the circularly polarized light, and the spin of a beam of photons is similar to the spin of a beam of particles, such as electrons.

In nature

Only a few mechanisms in nature are known to systematically produce circularly polarized light. In 1911, Albert Abraham Michelson discovered that light reflected from the golden scarab beetle Chrysina resplendens is preferentially left-polarized. Since then, circular polarization has been measured in several other scarab beetles such as Chrysina gloriosa, as well as some crustaceans such as the mantis shrimp. In these cases, the underlying mechanism is the molecular-level helicity of the chitinous cuticle.

The bioluminescence of the larvae of fireflies is also circularly polarized, as reported in 1980 for the species Photuris lucicrescens and Photuris versicolor. For fireflies, it is more difficult to find a microscopic explanation for the polarization, because the left and right lanterns of the larvae were found to emit polarized light of opposite senses. The authors suggest that the light begins with a linear polarization due to inhomogeneities inside aligned photocytes, and it picks up circular polarization while passing through linearly birefringent tissue.

Water-air interfaces provide another source of circular polarization. Sunlight that gets scattered back up towards the surface is linearly polarized. If this light is then totally internally reflected back down, its vertical component undergoes a phase shift. To an underwater observer looking up, the faint light outside Snell's window therefore is (partially) circularly polarized.

Weaker sources of circular polarization in nature include multiple scattering by linear polarizers, as in the circular polarization of starlight, and selective absorption by circularly dichroic media.

Radio emission from stars and pulsars can be strongly circularly polarized.

Two species of mantis shrimp have been reported to be able to detect circular polarized light.

See also
Polarizer
3D film
Chirality
Sinusoidal plane-wave solutions of the electromagnetic wave equation
Starlight polarization
Waveplate

References

Further reading

External links
 Circularly polarized light: beetles and displays
 Article on the mantis shrimp and circular polarization
Animation of Circular Polarization (on YouTube)
Comparison of Circular Polarization with Linear and Elliptical Polarizations (YouTube Animation)
Reversal of handedness of circularly polarized light by mirror. A demonstration – simple, cheap & instructive

Polarization (waves)
Stellar astronomy
Astrophysics